Paul D. "Tony" Hinkle (December 19, 1899 – September 22, 1992) was an American football, basketball, and baseball player, coach, and college athletic administrator.  He attended the University of Chicago, where he won varsity letters in three sports.  Hinkle captained the Chicago Maroons basketball team for two seasons was twice selected as an All-American, in 1919 and 1920.  After graduating from the University of Chicago, Hinkle moved on to Butler University as a coach.  There, over the course of nearly 50 years, he served as the head football coach (1926, 1935–1941, 1946–1969), head basketball coach (1926–1942, 1945–1970), and head baseball coach (1921–1928, 1933–1941, 1946–1970).  Hinkle was inducted into the Naismith Memorial Basketball Hall of Fame as a contributor in 1965.  Butler's home basketball arena was renamed as Hinkle Fieldhouse in the coach's honor in 1966.

Early life and playing career
Hinkle was born in Logansport, Indiana, to Edgar Clayton and Winnie (Ray) Hinkle.  He graduated in 1917 from Calumet High School in Chicago, Illinois, and attended the University of Chicago from 1917 to 1921. As a player at Chicago, he lettered three times in basketball, was twice All-Big Ten, twice team captain, named to the Helms All-America team in 1919 and 1920, was a member of the Big Ten Conference championship team in 1919–20, which lost the national championship to Penn.

Coaching career
Hinkle joined Butler University in 1921 when they were still at the Irvington campus; the university bought Fairview Park in 1922 and moved the campus there in 1928.  At Butler, Hinkle served as a teacher, coach and athletic administrator for nearly half a century. While he coached football, basketball, and baseball, he was primarily known as a basketball coach. His teams were fearless, gaining a reputation as "Big Ten killers". In 1929, the Butler Bulldogs basketball team he led to a 17–2 record was crowned national champion; in 1924, he had been assistant coach when they won the National AAU Tournament received similar honors.  Overall, his basketball teams scored 560 victories versus 392 defeats, and he scored more than 1,000 victories in all sports.

Hinkle was instrumental in ending the rule providing for a jump ball after every basket, and in the introduction of the three-second rule.
 
Basketballs were generally brown until Hinkle introduced the orange basketball in the late 1950s.  He also came up with the "Hinkle System" offense strategy, based on a complex system of motion, passes, picks and screens; it was adopted by many of the over 200 high school and college coaches trained by Hinkle.

Hinkle was president of the National Association of Basketball Coaches from 1954 to 1955, and served on their board. He won the NABC's top award in 1962 for contributions to the betterment of the game of basketball.  He was named Chairman of the Rules Committee of the National Basketball Committee of the U.S. and Canada.  Hinkle was inducted into the Naismith Memorial Basketball Hall of Fame in 1965, the Indiana Basketball Hall of Fame in 1964, and the Indiana Football Hall of Fame in 1974.

Hinkle's legacy is remembered on the Butler campus with Hinkle Fieldhouse, longtime site of Indiana's state high school championships and featured in the film Hoosiers.  The fieldhouse, originally named Butler Fieldhouse, was the largest basketball arena in the United States for decades. It was renamed as Hinkle Fieldhouse in 1966.  Hinkle coached 41 seasons of basketball at Butler, ending in 1970, and remained with Butler University until his death in 1992.

Hinkle is buried alongside his wife, Jane Murdock Stewart Hinkle (1907–1959) at Crown Hill Cemetery in Indianapolis.

Head coaching record

Football

Basketball

See also
 List of college football head coaches with non-consecutive tenure

References

External links
 
 Indiana Basketball Hall of Fame profile
 

1899 births
1992 deaths
American football ends
American men's basketball coaches
American men's basketball players
Guards (basketball)
Butler Bulldogs athletic directors
Butler Bulldogs baseball coaches
Butler Bulldogs football coaches
Butler Bulldogs men's basketball coaches
Chicago Maroons baseball players
Chicago Maroons football players
Chicago Maroons men's basketball players
Great Lakes Navy Bluejackets football coaches
College men's basketball head coaches in the United States
College men's track and field athletes in the United States
All-American college men's basketball players
Naismith Memorial Basketball Hall of Fame inductees
National Collegiate Basketball Hall of Fame inductees
People from Logansport, Indiana
Sportspeople from Chicago
Coaches of American football from Illinois
Players of American football from Chicago
Baseball coaches from Illinois
Baseball players from Chicago
Basketball coaches from Illinois
Basketball players from Chicago
Burials at Crown Hill Cemetery